William James Gallagher (May 13, 1875 – August 13, 1946) was a Representative to the U.S. Congress from Minnesota; born in Minneapolis, Hennepin County, Minnesota; attended the public schools, and was graduated from North High School in 1894; engaged as an editorial employee and proofreader in Minneapolis, MN, in 1895 and 1896; moved to Spokane, Washington, in 1897 and continued his former pursuits with a labor journal until 1899; returned to Minneapolis, and engaged as a trucker and clerk in freight houses until 1919; employed as a street sweeper for Hennepin County 1919–1927 and for the city of Minneapolis, from 1927 until his retirement in 1942; was elected as a Democrat to the 79th congress, and served from January 3, 1945, until his death; had been renominated to the 80th congress in 1946; died in a hospital at Rochester, Minnesota, August 13, 1946; interment in Crystal Lake Cemetery, Minneapolis, Minnesota.

See also
 List of United States Congress members who died in office (1900–49)

References

1875 births
1946 deaths
Democratic Party members of the United States House of Representatives from Minnesota
North Community High School alumni